The Geode Nunataks are a group of small nunataks on the west side of Sibelius Glacier, immediately north of the northern extremity of the Finlandia Foothills, in northeast Alexander Island, Antarctica. They were so named by the UK Antarctic Place-Names Committee in 1977; the nunataks are composed of lava flows with abundant geodes (cavities within the rock containing quartz and calcite crystals).

See also

 Appalachia Nunataks
 Ceres Nunataks
 Gannon Nunataks

References

Nunataks of Alexander Island